

Eadberht  was a medieval Bishop of Lichfield (or perhaps Bishop of Lindsey).

Eadberht is known from three charters which he witnessed as bishop, in 869, 875 and 875.  However the charters do not identify where he was Bishop of, so it is possible that Burgheard, who also signed the 869 charter, was bishop of Lichfield rather than Lindsey, and vice versa.

Eadberht was consecrated between 866 and 869. He died after 875.

Citations

References

External links
  (as Bishop of Lichfield)

Bishops of Lindsey